The 1951 Chicago White Sox season was the team's 51st season in the major leagues, and its 52nd season overall. They finished with a record of 81–73, good for fourth place in the American League, 17 games behind the first place New York Yankees.

Offseason 
 November 16, 1950: Joe DeMaestri was drafted by the White Sox from the Boston Red Sox in the 1950 rule 5 draft.
 Prior to 1951 season: Jay Porter was signed as an amateur free agent by the White Sox.

Regular season 
In 1951, the White Sox began using a bullpen car.

 May 1, 1951: Mickey Mantle hit his first big league home run against the White Sox. The pitcher who gave up the home run was Randy Gumpert.

Season standings

Record vs. opponents

Notable transactions 
 April 30, 1951: Gus Zernial and Dave Philley were traded by the White Sox to the Philadelphia Athletics as part of a three-team trade. Minnie Miñoso was traded to the White Sox by the Cleveland Indians, and Paul Lehner was traded to the White Sox by the Athletics. The Athletics sent Lou Brissie to the Indians. The Indians sent Sam Zoldak and Ray Murray to the Athletics.
 June 4, 1951: Hank Majeski was traded by the White Sox to the Philadelphia Athletics for Kermit Wahl.
 June 4, 1951: Kermit Wahl and Paul Lehner were traded by the White Sox to the St. Louis Browns for Don Lenhardt.
 July 31, 1951: Ray Coleman was selected off waivers by the White Sox from the St. Louis Browns.

Opening Day lineup 
 Chico Carrasquel, SS
 Floyd Baker, 3B
 Al Zarilla, RF
 Gus Zernial, LF
 Eddie Robinson, 1B
 Phil Masi, C
 Jim Busby, CF
 Nellie Fox, 2B
 Billy Pierce, P

Roster

Player stats

Batting 
Note: G = Games played; AB = At bats; R = Runs scored; H = Hits; 2B = Doubles; 3B = Triples; HR = Home runs; RBI = Runs batted in; BB = Base on balls; SO = Strikeouts; AVG = Batting average; SB = Stolen bases

Pitching 
Note: W = Wins; L = Losses; ERA = Earned run average; G = Games pitched; GS = Games started; SV = Saves; IP = Innings pitched; H = Hits allowed; R = Runs allowed; ER = Earned runs allowed; HR = Home runs allowed; BB = Walks allowed; K = Strikeouts

Farm system

Notes

References 
 1951 Chicago White Sox at Baseball Reference

Chicago White Sox seasons
Chicago White Sox season
Chicago White